This is a list of disk operating systems in which the acronym DOS is used to form their names. Many of these are simply referred to as "DOS" within their respective communities.

MS-DOS / IBM PC DOS compatible systems 

 MS-DOS (since 1981), Microsoft operating system based on 86-DOS for x86-based personal computers 
 IBM PC DOS (since 1981), OEM version of MS-DOS for the IBM Personal Computer and compatibles, manufactured and sold by IBM from the 1980s to the 2000s
 DR-DOS (since 1988), MS-DOS-compatible operating system originally developed by Digital Research
 ROM-DOS (1989), MS-DOS clone by Datalight
 PTS-DOS (since 1993), MS-DOS clone developed in Russia by PhysTechSoft
 FreeDOS (since 1998), open source MS-DOS clone

Other x86 disk operating systems with "DOS" in the name
 86-DOS (a.k.a. QDOS, created 1980), an operating system developed by Seattle Computer Products for its 8086-based S-100 computer kit, heavily inspired by CP/M
 Concurrent DOS (a.k.a. CDOS, Concurrent PC DOS and CPCDOS) (since 1983), a CP/M-86 and MS-DOS 2.11 compatible multiuser, multitasking DOS, based on Concurrent CP/M-86 developed by Digital Research
 DOS Plus (since 1985), a PC DOS and CP/M-86 compatible multitasking operating system for early x86-based personal computers, based on Concurrent PC DOS 4.1/5.0 by Digital Research
 Multiuser DOS (a.k.a. MDOS), a PC DOS and CP/M-86 compatible multiuser multitasking operating system based on Concurrent DOS by Digital Research
 NetWare PalmDOS, a successor of DR DOS 6.0 specifically tailored for early mobile and palmtop PCs by Novell
 Novell DOS, a multitasking successor of DR DOS 6.0 by Novell
 OpenDOS, a successor of Novell DOS by Caldera

Disk operating systems for the Atari 8-bit family 
 Atari DOS, from Atari, Inc.
 DOS XL, from Optimized Systems Software
 MyDOS
 SmartDOS 
 SpartaDOS
 TOP-DOS

Disk operating systems for other platforms 
 AmigaDOS, disk operating system portion of AmigaOS
 AMSDOS, for Amstrad CPC compatibles
 ANDOS, operating system for the Russian Electronika BK
 Apple DOS, operating system for the Apple II series from late 1978 through early 1983
 Apple ProDOS, name for both ProDOS 8 for the Apple II and ProDOS 16 for the Apple IIGS
 Commodore DOS, for Commodore's 8-bit computers
 Cromemco DOS (CDOS), a CP/M-like operating system
 CSI-DOS, for the Soviet Elektronika BK computers
 DOS (Diskette Operating System), a small OS for 16-bit Data General Nova computers, a cut-down version of their RDOS.
 DEC BATCH-11/DOS-11, the first operating system to run on the PDP-11 minicomputer
 Delta DOS, third party option from Premier Microsystems for the Dragon 32/64
 DIP DOS, the operating system of the Atari Portfolio
 DOS/360, 1966 IBM System/360 mainframe computer Disk Operating System
 DragonDOS, for the Dragon 32/64
 GEMDOS, one of the components of the Atari TOS
 IS-DOS, for Russian ZX Spectrum clones, developed in 1990 or 1991
 MasterDOS, replacement DOS for the SAM Coupé
 MDOS, Myarc Disk Operating System for the Geneve 9640
 MSX-DOS, a cross between MS-DOS 1.0 and CP/M developed by Microsoft for the MSX computer standard
 NewDos/80, Apparat's feature-rich alternative to TRSDOS for the TRS-80.
 Oric DOS, for the Oric-1 home computer
 PTDOS, for the 1970s Sol-20 from Processor Technology
 SAMDOS, original DOS for the SAM Coupé
 Sinclair QDOS, for the Sinclair QL
 RDOS, a real-time operating system released in 1972 for the Data General Nova and Eclipse minicomputers
 SK*DOS, for Motorola 68000-based systems
 TR-DOS, for the ZX Spectrum
 TRSDOS, for the Tandy TRS-80 line of 8-bit Zilog Z80 microcomputers
 Xtal DOS for the Tatung Einstein

See also
 DOS (disambiguation)
 DOS 1 (disambiguation)
 DOS 2 (disambiguation)
 DOS 3 (disambiguation)
 DOS 4 (disambiguation)
 DOS 5 (disambiguation)
 DOS 6 (disambiguation)
 DOS 7 (disambiguation)
 DOS 8 (disambiguation)
 DOS 10 (disambiguation)
 DOS 20 (disambiguation)
 DOS 30

References

 
D